USS Rondo has been the name of more than one United States Navy ship, and may refer to:

 , later USS SP-90, a patrol boat in commission from 1917 to 1919
 , a cargo ship in commission from 1918 to 1919

United States Navy ship names